George Fitzsimmons may refer to:
 George Fitzsimmons (public servant)
 George Fitzsimmons (serial killer)